Jason David Ingram is an American Christian music producer and songwriter. He has been a songwriter for many Christian artists, including Bebo Norman and Point of Grace.

Career 
Around the end of 2001, he was the first artist to be signed to Resonate Records, an INO Records partnership with Sonicflood's lead vocalist Rick Heil. He subsequently released his first album, Jason Ingram, on March 5, 2002.

Since 2003, Ingram has been the lead vocalist of the Christian pop rock band The Longing. Ingram is currently the lead vocalist for the band One Sonic Society.

Ingram has written songs for many contemporary Christian music artists. He wrote Bebo Norman's "I Will Lift My Eyes" and Salvador's "Shine". At the annual SESAC Awards, held in Nashville on March 5, 2007, Ingram received the "Christian Songwriter of the Year" award. After receiving the honor, he told Billboard, "I had no idea, it never crossed my mind. I am so thrilled. You write and you hope the songs affect people and get out there. It's cool when you see that really happens". He co-wrote three tracks on Brandon Heath's second album, What If We, including "Give Me Your Eyes", which won two GMA Dove Awards in 2009. He also co-wrote songs for Tenth Avenue North, including a No. 4 song on the Christian Billboard Charts, "Healing Begins".

Ingram co-wrote "One Day" with Nick Jonas and Dan Muckala in 2011 for the pop artist Charice. The song was used by AcuVue for a promotion called "AcuVue 1-day".

Personal life 
Ingram is the son of the Christian megachurch pastor Chip Ingram.

Awards 
2007: SESAC Award for "Christian Songwriter of the Year" – won
2009: GMA Dove Award for "Songwriter of the Year" – nominated
2009: GMA Dove Award for "Producer of the Year" – nominated
2011: GMA Dove Award for "Producer of the Year" – nominated
 2016 Grammy nomination for best contemporary Christian song/performance – nominated
 2019 "You Say", which he co- wrote with Lauren Daigle and Paul Mabury, won the Grammy Award for Best Contemporary Christian Music Performance/Song. – won
 2019 Look Up Child, which he co- produced with Paul Mabury, won the GMA Dove Award for Pop/Contemporary Album of the Year – won
 2019: GMA Dove Award for Songwriter of the Year (Non-artist) – won
 2019: GMA Dove Award for Producer of the Year – won (team with Paul Mabury)

Production discography 
 2007 – Rush of Fools by Rush of Fools
 2007 – The Glorious Revolution by Grey Holiday
 2008 – Not Without Love by Jimmy Needham
 2008 – Over and Underneath by Tenth Avenue North
 2008 – The Invitation by Meredith Andrews
 2008 – Wonder of the World by Rush of Fools
 2009 – Take Over by Aaron Shust
 2010 – Radiant by Josh Fox
 2010 – As Long as It Takes by Meredith Andrews
 2012 – If It Leads Me Back by Lindsay McCaul
 2012 – Nothing Left to Fear by Andy Cherry
 2013 – Burning Lights by Chris Tomlin
 2014 – Made Up My Mind by Johnathan Miller
 2015 – Brave New World by Amanda Lindsey Cook
 2016 – Behold: A Christmas Collection by Lauren Daigle
 2017 – After All These Years by Brian & Jenn Johnson
 2017 – After All These Years (Instrumental) by Bethel Music
 2018 – Reckless Love by Cory Asbury
 2018 – Look Up Child by Lauren Daigle
 2019 - House on a Hill by Amanda Lindsey Cook
 2020 - Forever Amen by Steffany Gretzinger
 2021 - Old Church Basement by Elevation Worship and Maverick City Music

References

Living people
20th-century Christians
21st-century Christians
American male songwriters
American performers of Christian music
Record producers from West Virginia
Christian music songwriters
People from West Virginia
Year of birth missing (living people)